J'Mon Moore (born May 23, 1995) is an American football wide receiver who is currently a free agent. He played college football at Missouri, and was selected by the Green Bay Packers in the fourth round of the 2018 NFL Draft. He has also been a member of the NFL's Cleveland Browns, Houston Texans, and Atlanta Falcons, as well as the USFL's New Jersey Generals.

Early years
Moore attended Elkins High School in Missouri City, Texas. While there, he played high school football for the Knights. On April 17, 2012, he committed to the University of Missouri to play college football.

College career
Moore played on the Missouri Tigers football team from 2013 to 2017 under head coaches Gary Pinkel and Barry Odom. He led the team in receiving his sophomore and senior season. His 1,012 yards as a junior led the Southeastern Conference (SEC). He finished his career with 158 receptions for 2,477 yards and 21 touchdowns.

College statistics

Professional career

Green Bay Packers
Moore was selected by the Green Bay Packers in the fourth round of the 2018 NFL Draft with the 133rd overall pick. He signed his rookie contract on May 7, 2018. He recorded his first professional catch on October 15, 2018 in a Week 6 win over the San Francisco 49ers.

On August 31, 2019, Moore was waived by the Packers.

Cleveland Browns
Moore was signed to the Cleveland Browns' practice squad on November 25, 2019. The Browns signed Moore to their reserve/futures list on December 30, 2019.

Moore was placed on the active/non-football injury list at the start of training camp on August 2, 2020, and activated from the list six days later. The Browns waived Moore on September 3, 2020.

Houston Texans
On December 2, 2020, the Houston Texans signed Moore to their practice squad. He signed a reserve/future contract on January 4, 2021. He was waived on March 16, 2021.

Atlanta Falcons
On July 30, 2021, Moore signed with the Atlanta Falcons. On August 14, 2021, Moore was waived/injured and placed on injured reserve. He was released on August 24.

New Jersey Generals
Moore was selected with the second pick of the fourteenth round of the 2022 USFL Draft by the New Jersey Generals. He was transferred to the team's inactive roster on April 22, 2022, due to a hamstring injury.

Pittsburgh Maulers
Moore had his USFL playing rights transferred to the Pittsburgh Maulers on October 20, 2022.

NFL career statistics

References

External links
Cleveland Browns bio
Green Bay Packers bio 
Missouri Tigers bio

1995 births
Living people
American football wide receivers
Atlanta Falcons players
Cleveland Browns players
Green Bay Packers players
Houston Texans players
Missouri Tigers football players
People from Missouri City, Texas
Players of American football from Texas
Sportspeople from Harris County, Texas
New Jersey Generals (2022) players
Pittsburgh Maulers (2022) players